Keyang Electric Co, Ltd. is a South Korean machinery, electric, engineering and automotive company headquartered in Seoul. It was established in 1977, and manufactures  machine, tool and auto parts products, manual and auto pipe cleaner machinery. It has factories in Ansan and Cheonan. The CEO is Lee Hyeong-Ho (이형호).

Group companies
Haeseong Industry
Hankook Paper
Hankook Package
Wooyeong Engineering
Haeseong Culture Foundation
Haeseong Academy
Hyper CC

Products
Power Tools
Industrial Engine
Tool Accessory
Sales Department Engineering Machine
Automotive Parts

See also
Economy of South Korea

External links
Main
Keyang Electric Homepage (in English and Korean)
Keyang Electric Europe (in English and Dutch)
Group
Haesung Industry Homepage (in Korean)
Hankook Paper Homepage (in Korean)
Hankook Package Homepage (in Korean)
Haesung Academy Homepage (in Korean)

Engineering companies of South Korea
Electronics companies of South Korea
Auto parts suppliers of South Korea
Manufacturing companies based in Seoul
Manufacturing companies established in 1977
Power tool manufacturers
South Korean brands
South Korean companies established in 1977
Tool manufacturers